Triveni Sangh was a caste coalition and  political party established in Shahabad District of Bihar  in pre-independence India to voice the political solidarity of "middle peasant castes" as well as  to carve a space in democratic politics for the lower castes. The date of formation of the Triveni Sangh has been variously stated. Some sources have said it was the 1920s but Kumar notes recently discovered documentation that makes 1933 more likely, while  Christophe Jaffrelot has said 1934. The leaders associated with the formation of this front were Yadunandan Prasad Mehta, Shivpujan Singh and Jagdev Singh Yadav.

Formation 
The Triveni Sangh was formed in 1934 by the members of three prominent Backward Castes of Bihar; Yadav, Koeri, and Kurmi. Its nomenclature was derived from the confluence of three mighty rivers viz. the Ganga, Yamuna and the mythical  Saraswati at Allahabad.
The Sangh claimed of having at least one million dues-paying members. Its formation was countered by the formation of Indian National Congress's backward class federation, which was established at the same time.
The party took part in 1937 elections and suffered badly but it managed to win at places like 'Arrah' and 'Piro' in Shahabad District. As a result of this,  upper castes reacted violently. In the meantime the party was also affected due to double-edged confrontation emerging out of the disunity between the three allied castes and superior organisational structure of Congress.
According to political analysts, the superiority complex in Yadavs vis a vis Kurmi and Koeris lead to the decline of the organisation which could claim of being the first political set-up of backward castes in Bihar.

History 
The formation of the organization has a root emerging from Lakhochak riot (1925). In this village of Munger district, a caste council meeting of Yadavs was seen by local Bhumihar landlords as a challenge to their social and ritual position, who were wary of sanskritizing trend observed in a ritually unpure caste. Also, the upper caste saw this new trend as a possible barrier for the illegitimate dues they obtain from these peasant castes in form of Begar i.e free service as well as surplus like Ghee, Milk and agricultural products.

In the second conference of Sangh held at Ekwaari village, it poised to fight for the cause of Kisan (peasants), Mazdoor (labourers) and small traders. It also protested against social oppression, especially the rapes of lower caste women by upper caste landlords. In many districts of Bihar it became a symbol of rising political ambition of backward castes.   It also published its mouthpiece called "Triveni Sangh Ka Bigul".

Development of anti Congress stance
The Congress party, in decades after independence was dominated by upper castes, who were responsible for seizure of all opportunities from backward castes for political representation. When leaders of backward caste sought to obtain ticket from Congress, for contesting in any election, they were always denied on the grounds of being ineligible for the same. According to Hindi novelist Omprakash Kashyap, even if they fulfill all the grounds for eligibility, they were told that legislature is not the place where vegetables are sown, cattle bred and milked as well as oil and salt are sold. This was an indirect attack on traditional professions of backward caste.

The ticketing policy of congress as exposed later was in the favour of upper caste, and many a time they sidelined popular backward caste leaders in order to pave the way for upper caste to rise in power. This was witnessed, when Kurmi leader Deosharan Singh was sidelined against a Bhumihar leader, whom another Kurmi leader, Ramlakhan had defeated earlier. Numerous such incident made backward caste a staunch supporter of Triveni Sangh.

Merger with the Congress
However, the rift between Congress and the Triveni Sangh was not insurmountable, as claimed by William Pinch, and the latter, after performing badly in elections against the Congress, merged with the Congress led Backward Class Federation. The merger, though ended in the demise of Sangh,  brought some positive consequences for the three castes involved in its formation. The Triveni Sangh leaders were given posts in the organisation by 1940s, and in the subsequent elections, the leaders of Kurmi, Yadav and Kushwaha caste were allotted tickets from the Congress. The lost in independent identity was compensated by the gain in terms of direct access to political power. 

Hence, despite having same economic motive, the union and the cooperation between both organisations remained unsuccessful.

Social impact
In 1927 and 1933 district board elections, it placed its candidates against upper-castes, but was not much successful. Its charm after independence faded, but it made it clear, that dominance of upper caste would not remain forever.

The Triveni Sangh movement of 1930 is said to have sowed the seed of political consciousness among the Koeri, Kurmi and Yadav caste of Bihar, which are variously described as upper backwards. The movement further paved the way for these castes to challenge the muscle power of "upper caste" in the later years, when Ram Manohar Lohia led the political front against Congress in Bihar in the 1980s. It was due to earlier efforts like the 'Sangh' that these middle peasant castes were able to stand up to upper castes in all spheres of life given that by the time they became fully conscious of their rights. According to Sanjay Kumar:

In later years, there was an attempt for a revival of this defunct organisation by All India Yadav Conference, particularly at Patna in 1965. In 2015 Legislative Assembly elections of Bihar, the putatively put alliance of Rashtriya Janata Dal and Janata Dal (United) was covered by media as an informal  revival of Triveni Sangh.

See also
Arjak Sangh

References 

Reform movements
Bihari politicians